Adam Again is an American rock band that was active from 1982 until the 2000 death of founder, leader and vocalist Gene Eugene, with Riki Michele on vocals, Paul Valadez on bass, Jon Knox on drums, Greg Lawless on guitar. Dan Michaels often played saxophone.

Thom Jurek of AllMusic has described them as "inventive and artfully canny." The band never achieved commercial viability and quit touring and recording together after March 20, 2000, when Eugene died in his recording studio, the "fabulous" Green Room.  On September 20, 2013, bassist Paul Valadez died.

Discography 

 In a New World of Time (1986) 
 Ten Songs by Adam Again (1988)
 Homeboys (1990)
 Dig (1992)
 Perfecta (1995)
 Worldwide Favourites (1999)
 A Tribute to Gene Eugene (2000)
 Adam Again Tribute Boxed Set (2001)

Reissues 
 In a New World of Time (1990)  Reissue on CD by An Adam Again Independent Recording AAIR0001
 Homeboys + Dig (Music Value Pack) (2000) This KMG Records contains two albums on one CD. It is missing "No Regret" from Homeboys and "So Long" from Dig.
 Ten Songs by Adam Again (2002)  Remastered by Lo-Fidelity Records. Only 1000 copies were made.
 Ten Songs by Adam Again (2013)  Remastered by Frontline Records.
 Dig (2016)  Remastered by Lo-Fidelity Records.

References

Further reading

External links 
 Adam Again on Facebook
 [ Adam Again] on AllMusic

Christian rock groups from California
Musical groups established in 1982
1982 establishments in California